, Jet2.com operates to the following destinations:

List

See also

 Jet2.com
 Transport in the United Kingdom

References

External links 
 Jet2.com destination list

Jet2.com